The following is List of Universities and Colleges in Qinghai. As of 2012, there are 14 institutions of higher learning in the province, out of which 3 offer Bachelor's degree studies.

Notation

Note: The list is arranged in the default order followed the one provided by MOE

References

External links
List of Chinese Higher Education Institutions — Ministry of Education
List of Chinese universities, including official links
Qinghai Institutions Admitting International Students

 
Qinghai